Rudy Hayes (January 12, 1935 – February 15, 2020) was an American football linebacker. He played for the Pittsburgh Steelers from 1959 to 1960 and in 1962.

He died on February 15, 2020, in Pickens, South Carolina at age 85.

References

1935 births
2020 deaths
American football linebackers
Clemson Tigers football players
Pittsburgh Steelers players